McWhirter and Macwhirter, MacWhirter (also spelled McWherter and Macwherter, MacWherter) are Anglicisations of the Scottish Gaelic Mac an Chruiteir, meaning "son of the harpist or fiddler". Mawhorter and McWhorter are less common forms of this Scottish name, and are found in North America. The name is derived from the Gaelic cruitear, meaning "harpist", "fiddler". The Scottish name is generally found in Ayrshire. The surnames can be represented in modern Scottish Gaelic as Mac a' Chruiteir.

People with the surnames
Macwhirter, MacWhirter
Iain Macwhirter Scottish political commentator
John MacWhirter (1839–1911), Scottish landscape painter
McWhirter
Alastair McWhirter (born 1953), British police officer and chief constable
Anthony McWhirter (1872–1932), Scottish footballer
Douglas McWhirter (1886–1966), English Olympic football player
George McWhirter (born 1939), Irish-Canadian writer
David McWhirter (1948–2005), Texas A&M English Professor
John McWhirter (contemporary), British mathematician and engineer
Julie McWhirter (born 1947), American voice actress
Kent Franklin McWhirter (Kent McCord) American Actor
Louise McWhirter (1896–1957), writer on financial astrology
Norrie McWhirter (born 1969), Scottish footballer (St. Mirren FC)
Norris McWhirter (1925–2004), British writer and political activist; cofounder of the Guinness World Records; brother of Ross McWhirter
Ross McWhirter (1925–1975), British cofounder of Guinness World Records; brother of Norris McWhirter; assassinated
Steven McWhirter (born 1983), Northern Irish pipe band drummer

McWherter, Macwherter, MacWherter
Ned McWherter (1930–2011), 46th governor of Tennessee

McWhorter, MacWhorter
William A. McWhorter (1918–1944), US Army WWII (casualty) Medal of Honor recipient from Liberty, Pickens, South Carolina
Alexander MacWhorter (1734–1807), American Clergyman

References

Anglicised Scottish Gaelic-language surnames
Scottish surnames
Patronymic surnames